Sir Robert Kemp, 4th Baronet  (9 November 1699 – 1752)), of Ubbeston, Suffolk, was a British landowner and Tory politician who sat in the House of Commons from 1730 to 1734.

Kemp was baptized at Hoxne, Suffolk,  the only son of Sir Robert Kemp, 3rd Baronet of Ubbeston, Suffolk and his second wife Elizabeth Brand, daughter  of John Brand of Edwardstone, Suffolk.  He was admitted at Pembroke College, Cambridge on 3 July 1718 and at Middle Temple on 17 November 1721.

Kemp was returned as a Tory Member of Parliament for Orford at a by-election on 23 February 1730. He voted against the Government on all known occasions. He did not stand at the 1734 British general election.

Kemp succeeded his father in the baronetcy on 18 December 1734. He died unmarried on. 15 February 1752  and was buried in the family vault at Gissing, Norfolk. He was succeeded by his brother John Kemp.

References

1699 births
1752 deaths
British MPs 1727–1734
Members of the Parliament of Great Britain for English constituencies
Baronets in the Baronetage of England